Mariya Aleksandrovna Bespalova (born 21 May 1986 in Leningrad) is a Russian hammer thrower. She competed in the hammer throw event at the 2012 Summer Olympics. On 30 March 2017, her 2012 Olympic results were annulled, after her second probe tested positive for banned substances.

In 2015, Bespalova was suspended for four years after she failed a drug test for dehydrochlormethyltestosterone doping.

References

External links

1986 births
Living people
Athletes from Saint Petersburg
Russian female hammer throwers
Olympic athletes of Russia
Athletes (track and field) at the 2012 Summer Olympics
Doping cases in athletics
Russian sportspeople in doping cases